Janine Sandell (born 7 December 1985) is a British volleyball player. She competed for Great Britain at the 2012 Summer Olympics.
Sandell was a member of the Great Britain team that won their first ever match in the modern Summer Olympics women's volleyball competition. She moved to Spain to play volleyball professionally in club CV Albacete and has played in several Spanish clubs since.

References

British women's volleyball players
Volleyball players at the 2012 Summer Olympics
Olympic volleyball players of Great Britain
1985 births
Living people
Outside hitters